Madera is the Spanish word for lumber. It may also refer to:

Places

Americas
 Madera County, California, in the United States
 Madera, California, the county seat of Madera County
 Madera Peak, a mountain in Madera County 
 Madera Ranchos, California, an unincorporated community in Madera County
 Madera AVA, a wine region partially located in Madera County
 Madera, Chihuahua, in Mexico
 La Madera, Rio Arriba County, New Mexico
 La Madera, Sandoval County, New Mexico
 Madera, Pennsylvania

Europe
Madera, Kuyavian-Pomeranian Voivodeship (north-central Poland)
Madera, Łódź Voivodeship (central Poland)
Madera, Pomeranian Voivodeship (north Poland)
 Paterna del Madera, Albacete, Spain

Train stations
Madera station (Amtrak), a train station in Madera, California
Storey station, a closed train station referred by Amtrak as "Madera"
Madera station (California High-Speed Rail), a proposed train station
Madera station (Medellín), a metro station in Colombia

People with the surname
Kasia Madera, English journalist
Lupe Madera (1952–2005), Mexican boxer

See also
Madeira (disambiguation)
Madero (disambiguation)